Snowfire is a 1958 American Western film written, directed and produced by Dorrell McGowan, and Stuart E. McGowan. The film stars Don Megowan, primarily a western actor, but better known today as the monster in The Creature Walks Among Us. Molly McGowan and Claire Kelly also star. The screenplay concerns a little girl who claims to be friends with a supposedly savage white stallion.

Premise
A little girl claims to be friends with a supposedly savage white stallion.

Cast
 Don Megowan as Mike
 Molly McGowan	as Molly 
 Claire Kelly as Carol 
 John L. Cason	as Buff (as John Cason)
 Michael Vallon as Poco (as Mike Vallon)
 Melody McGowan as Melodie (as Melodie McGowan)
 Rusty Wescoatt as Link
 Bill Hale	as Skip 
 King Cotton the Horse	as Snowfire

References

External links
 Snowfire at The Internet Movie Data Base
 Snowfire at Movie Pictures.org

1958 films
1958 Western (genre) films
American Western (genre) films
Films about horses
Allied Artists films
Films scored by Albert Glasser
1950s English-language films
1950s American films